Tom Owen (born 19 June 1951) is a former speedway rider from England.

Speedway career 
Owen rode in the top two tiers of British Speedway from 1972 to 1987, riding for various clubs. In 1975 and 1976, he finished second to his younger brother Joe Owen in the league averages. Tom then topped the averages for three consecutive years in 1977, 1978 and 1979 becoming arguably the National League's leading rider during the period. In 1984, he won the National League Pairs Championship with Nigel Crabtree.

References 

Living people
1951 births
British speedway riders
Hull Vikings riders
Newcastle Diamonds riders
Newport Wasps riders
Stoke Potters riders